The 1905 Arizona football team was an American football team that represented the University of Arizona as an independent during the 1905 college football season. In its first and only season under head coach William M. Ruthrauff, the team compiled a 4–2 record and shut out its first four opponents, but were then outscored by two California colleges, 96 to 5. The team captain was John M. Ruthrauff. The team was declared the Arizona Territory champion.

Schedule

References

Arizona
Arizona Wildcats football seasons
Arizona football